Konstantin Igorevich Rykov (Константин Игоревич Рыков), a.k.a. Jason Foris (Джейсон Форис) (born 27 May 1979) is a Russian politician.

Biography
Rykov was born in Moscow. Since 1998 he made his mark as one of the first professional Russian Internet producers. Rykov together with Egor Lavrov created websites and television programs such as the popular TV show Star Factory. Since 2002 he has been working as head of the Internet department of the First Channel of the state television, where he cooperated with art impresario Marat Gelman in a range of political websites.

Rykov's latest media projects include the production of electronic newspapers Дни and Взгляд (Dni and Vzglyad - "Days" and "Look"),  publication and promotion of controversial bestselling novelists Sergey Minaev and Eduard Bagirov, and support of Vladimir Putin via several websites.

On 2 December 2007, Rykov was elected as a deputy of the Duma representing Nizhny Novgorod as a candidate of pro-Kremlin party United Russia. He served in the Duma through 2011.

Besides his own personal involvement in Russian politics, Rykov has also reportedly used his internet credentials and relationship with Kremlin officials to involve himself in various political campaigns and referendums in both Russia and other countries. Following Russia's invasion and subsequent annexation of Ukraine's Crimean Peninsula in 2014, Rykov and numerous followers flooded social networks with pro-Kremlin narratives and even directly engaged US officials such as the former U.S. Ambassador to Russia, Michael McFaul. The following year, Rykov started a Russian website in support of then U.S. presidential candidate Donald Trump, and would later boast that he was responsible for Trump's victory in the 2016 U.S. Presidential Election. He also claimed that though they succeeded with Trump they unfortunately failed with Marine Le Pen.
These claims, including the role of Cambridge Analytica, were posted a year before Special Counsel Robert Mueller would indict members of the Internet Research Agency involved in active measures to win the US election for Donald Trump and years before FBI indictments revealed the role of WikiLeaks in deploying material hacked by Fancy Bear, associated with Russian military agency GRU, and the FSB’s Cozy Bear group from the Democratic National Committee.

References

External links
 The Moscow Times: Rykov's publishing promotions
 

1979 births
Russian bloggers
Living people
Fifth convocation members of the State Duma (Russian Federation)
United Russia politicians
21st-century Russian politicians
Plekhanov Russian University of Economics alumni